The Autopista B-23 or Acceso a Barcelona centro is a Spanish motorway that goes from Avinguda Diagonal, in Barcelona City, with the AP-7. It is part of the European route E90.

The autopista starts in the Avinguda Diagonal, at Les Corts district. Then it continues crossing the towns of Esplugues de Llobregat, Sant Just Desvern, Sant Joan Despí and Sant Feliú de Llobregat. Then it continues parallel to Llobregat River and A-2, and surrounds Molins de Rei and El Papiol before joining to AP-.

References 

B-23
Transport in Catalonia
Transport in Barcelona
Transport in Baix Llobregat